Mikie Rowe (born 3 July 1996) is an Irish footballer who plays as a forward for Galway United in League of Ireland First Division.

References

External links
 
 Profile at Young Harris Athletics

1996 births
Living people
Republic of Ireland association footballers
Republic of Ireland expatriate association footballers
Association football forwards
Expatriate soccer players in the United States
Irish expatriate sportspeople in the United States
People from Wexford, County Wexford
Tormenta FC players
League of Ireland players
USL League One players
USL League Two players
Waterford F.C. players
Galway United F.C. players
Young Harris Mountain Lions men's soccer players